Giambattista Andreini (9 February 1576 – 7 June 1654) was an Italian actor and the most important Italian playwright of the 17th century.

Life

Born in Florence to stage stars Isabella Andreini and Francesco Andreini, he had a great success as a comedian in Paris under the name of Leylio. He was a favourite with Louis XIII, and also with the public, especially as the young lover.

His wife Virginia Ramponi-Andreini, whom he married in 1601, was also a celebrated actress and singer.

Works

He left a number of plays full of extravagant imagination. The best known are L'Adamo (Milan, 1613), The Penitent Magdalene (Mantua, 1617), and The Centaur (Paris, 1622). From the first of these three volumes, which are extremely rare, Italians have often asserted that Milton, travelling at that time in their country, took the idea of Paradise Lost.

Notes

Bibliography 
 
 Katritzky, M. A. (2006). The Art of Commedia: A Study in the Commedia Dell'Arte 1560-1620, p. 245. Rodopi. 
 Snyder, Jon (2007). "Giovan Battista Andreini", vol. 1, pp. 36–38, in Encyclopedia of Italian Literary Studies, edited by Gaetana Marrone. New York/London: Routledge. .

External links 

1576 births
1654 deaths
17th-century Italian male actors
17th-century Italian writers
17th-century Italian dramatists and playwrights
Italian male stage actors
Italian dramatists and playwrights
Actors from Florence
Writers from Florence
Commedia dell'arte
Expatriates of the Grand Duchy of Tuscany in France